Samuel Crawford (April 20, 1820February 28, 1861) was an Irish American immigrant, lawyer, and Wisconsin pioneer.  He was one of the first elected justices of the Wisconsin Supreme Court in 1853.  He was also the first incumbent Wisconsin Supreme Court justice to be defeated seeking re-election.

Early life

Born in Ballybay, Ireland—then part of the United Kingdom of Great Britain and Ireland—Crawford emigrated to New York City in 1840. In 1841, he moved to Galena, Illinois, where his brothers lived; he studied law and was admitted to the Illinois bar in 1844.

Later that year, he moved north into the Wisconsin Territory, arriving first at New Diggings—then part of Iowa County—and, in December, settling in Mineral Point.  He established a law practice there, in partnership with Francis J. Dunn and David W. Jones, and became involved with local affairs.

Wisconsin Supreme Court

When an 1852 law established a new Wisconsin Supreme Court, Crawford was elected to serve as one of the first three justices, along with Abram D. Smith and Chief Justice Edward V. Whiton.  The most significant case of his two years on the court was certainly Ableman v. Booth, which dealt with attempts by the federal government to prosecute Milwaukee abolitionist Sherman Booth.  Booth had assisted Joshua Glover in his escape from slavery to freedom in Canada and was being prosecuted under the federal Fugitive Slave Act of 1850.  The Wisconsin Supreme Court ruled, in 1854, that the Fugitive Slave Act was unconstitutional and freed Booth on a defective warrant.  Judge Crawford dissented in part, concurring that the warrant was defective but dissenting that the Fugitive Slave Act was unconstitutional.

Though his opinion was ultimately validated by the Supreme Court of the United States in their 1859 decision on Ableman v. Booth, his dissent in the 1854 Booth case likely cost him re-election due to the strong anti-slavery sentiment in Wisconsin.

Later years

Judge Crawford was defeated seeking re-election in 1855 and resumed his law practice in Mineral Point. He would later be selected as the Democratic Party's nominee for United States House of Representatives in Wisconsin's 2nd congressional district in 1856 and then for Attorney General of Wisconsin in 1859, but was unsuccessful in both campaigns.

Crawford died of "congestion of the brain" (an ischemic stroke) at his home in Mineral Point on February 28, 1861.

Personal life and family

Crawford was married to Ms. Jane Milton Sweet, of Edgartown, Massachusetts, in 1848.  They had four children.  After Judge Crawford's death, in 1861, Jane remarried with John Montgomery Smith.

Electoral history

Wisconsin Supreme Court (1853, 1855)

| colspan="6" style="text-align:center;background-color: #e9e9e9;"| General Election, April 3, 1855

U.S. House of Representatives (1856)

| colspan="6" style="text-align:center;background-color: #e9e9e9;"| General Election, November 4, 1856

Wisconsin Attorney General (1859)

| colspan="6" style="text-align:center;background-color: #e9e9e9;"| General Election, November 8, 1859

References

|-

People from County Monaghan
People from Galena, Illinois
Illinois lawyers
Wisconsin lawyers
People from Mineral Point, Wisconsin
Justices of the Wisconsin Supreme Court
1820 births
1861 deaths
Irish emigrants to the United States (before 1923)
19th-century American judges
19th-century American lawyers